A table showing the results of general elections for United States House of Representatives from Delaware, beginning in 1788 when the United States Constitution of 1787 went into effect.

United States House of Representatives

 for the way "at-large" seats were selected between 1812 and 1820

Notes

References

External links
Office of the Clerk, U.S. House of Representatives. 
Our Campaigns